The 2017 Atlantic Coast Conference women's soccer season was the 29th season of women's varsity soccer in the conference.

The Notre Dame Fighting Irish and Clemson Tigers the defending regular season champions.  The Florida State Seminoles are the defending ACC tournament Champions.

Changes from 2016 

There were no coaching changes from 2016 to 2017.

Teams

Stadiums and locations 

1.  Georgia Tech does not sponsor women's soccer

Personnel

Pre-season

Pre-season poll
The ACC women's soccer pre-season poll was determined by a vote of all 14 ACC women's soccer head coaches.  The poll was voted on as teams began their pre-season training during the first week of August.  The coaches also voted on a pre-season all-ACC team.

Pre-season coaches poll

Florida State – 186 points (8 First-Place Votes)
North Carolina – 172 (2)
Duke – 170 (1)
Virginia – 160 (2)
Notre Dame – 145 (1)
Clemson – 120
NC State – 104
Virginia Tech – 91
Wake Forest – 72
Boston College – 71
Miami – 65
Louisville – 63
Syracuse – 33
Pittsburgh – 18

Pre-Season All-ACC Team

Hermann Trophy Watchlist
The ACC had 4 women named to the Hermann Trophy watchlist prior to the season.
Deyna Castellanos – Florida State
Natalia Kuikka – Florida State
Cassie Miller – Florida State
Bridgette Andrzejewski – North Carolina

Regular season

Rankings

United Soccer

Top Drawer Soccer

Statistics 

Overall season statistics can be found on the ACC's website.

Players of the Week

Postseason

ACC tournament

NCAA tournament

The ACC had a total of 8 teams selected to the NCAA tournament.  This was the second most number of teams from any conference in the tournament, behind the SEC (9). All teams were selected to host a first round match, and two teams were selected as number one seeds.

Awards and honors

United Soccer Coaches All-Americans

Six total players from the ACC were named to the United Soccer Coaches All-America teams.  Two players were named to each the first, second and third team.

First Team
 Imani Dorsey, Duke
 Rebecca Quinn, Duke

Second Team
 Deyna Castellanos, Florida State
 Alessia Russo, North Carolina

Third Team
 Schuyler DeBree, Duke
 Sandra Yu, Notre Dame

ACC Awards

Draft picks

The ACC had 12 total players selected in the 2018 NWSL College Draft.  There were 3 players selected in the first round, 1 player selected in the second round, 5 players selected in the third round, and 3 players selected in the fourth round.  Duke lead the way with 6 players selected, Wake Forest and North Carolina had 2 players selected each, and Virginia and Notre Dame each had 1 player selected.

References 

 
2017 NCAA Division I women's soccer season